The Drake Hotel was a hotel at 440 Park Avenue and 56th Street, in Midtown Manhattan, New York City. Built in 1926 by Bing & Bing, it contained 495 rooms across 21 floors. It was sold in 2006 and demolished to make way for a residential skyscraper called 432 Park Avenue.

History
The hotel was built in 1926 by the real estate organization of Bing & Bing. It was a 21-floor complex with 495 rooms. According to one source, "it boasted innovations such as automatic refrigeration as well as spacious, luxurious rooms and suites". Fauchon chocolates was located on the ground floor.

Notable residents
Silent film star Lillian Gish lived at the hotel from 1946 to 1949. Other notable guests included Frank Sinatra, Muhammad Ali, Judy Garland, Jimi Hendrix and Glenn Gould. Restaurateur Toots Shor lived there in his final years. Songwriter Jerome Kern collapsed on the sidewalk in front of the Drake on November 5, 1945.

In the 1960s and 1970s, the Drake Hotel was the preferred accommodation in New York for a number of touring rock bands, such as Led Zeppelin and The Who. During their stay there in July 1973, Led Zeppelin had $203,000 in cash stolen from a safe deposit box at the hotel. The money was never recovered and the identity of the thief or thieves has never been discovered. The band later sued the Drake Hotel for the theft. The British rock band Slade stayed at the hotel on October 6, 1973 after their gig at the New York Academy of Music. Another British rock band Sweet made The Drake their home away from home during gruelling tours in the USA in the 1970s.

In 1982, The Drake hotel accommodated singers Karen Carpenter and Olivia Newton-John.  Carpenter was a California resident who sought treatment for an eating disorder from Manhattan psychotherapist Steven Levenkron.

Venues

The Drake Room, opened in 1945, was the Drake's restaurant, presided over by Beniamino Schiavon ("Mr. Nino of the Drake") from its opening until 1968. Cy Walter played piano from its opening to 1951, and then from 1959 until at least 1966.

The Drake's nightclub, Shepheard's, was touted as New York's first discotheque and the most fashionable of the mid-1960s with celebrities like Lee Radziwill and Julie Newmar dancing to a disc jockey until 3 a.m. seven days a week, despite its tiny dance floor. The club even had printed and distributed cards entitled, “How to Do the Newest Discotheque Dances at Shepheard's in New York's Drake Hotel” with step-by-step instructions to dance the Jerk, Watusi, Frug and the Monkey.

Demolition and redevelopment
The hotel was acquired in the early 1980s by the Swissotel company of Zurich, which renamed it Swissotel The Drake and undertook a $52 million room-by-room renovation of the building. The hotel received positive national exposure, as the syndicated talk show Donahue used the hotel to accommodate the show's guests, in exchange for a mention of it on each episode. Renovations were completed in 1991. In 2006 the hotel was sold for $440 million (equivalent to $ million in ) to developer Harry Macklowe. It was demolished in 2007, and the site became one of New York's most valuable development sites in 2011. In mid-2012, construction began on a  residential skyscraper, 432 Park Avenue, on the site. Designed by Rafael Viñoly, the tower topped out in October 2014, becoming the tallest building in New York City by roof height, and the tallest residential building in the Western Hemisphere at the time of its completion.

See also
 List of former hotels in Manhattan

References

External links
 New York Architecture Images: Drake Hotel, nyc-architecture.com

Buildings and structures demolished in 2007
Demolished hotels in New York City
Hotel buildings completed in 1926
Defunct hotels in Manhattan
Park Avenue
Former skyscrapers
Skyscraper hotels in Manhattan
Demolished buildings and structures in Manhattan
Midtown Manhattan